Kamiennik Wielki is a village in the administrative district of Gmina Milejewo, within Elbląg County, Warmian-Masurian Voivodeship, in northern Poland.

Demographics

Population
The village has a population of 570, a number that has increased over time.

 1820 – 300 inhabitants
 1875 – 435 inhabitants
 1894 – 550 inhabitants
 1925 – 533 inhabitants
 1998 – 546 inhabitants
 2011 – 558 inhabitants

Gender structure (2011)

Female: 49.1%
Male: 50.9%

Age structure (2011)

Pre-working age: 21.0%
Working age: 69.0%
After working age: 10.0%

References

Kamiennik Wielki